The women's qualification for the Olympic basketball tournament will occur between 2022 and 2024; all five FIBA (International Basketball Federation) zones are expected to have a representation in the Olympic basketball event. 

As the host nation, France reserves a quota place in the women's 5×5 basketball; however, it is subject to a FIBA Central Board decision to be made on 30 June 2023. The first spot will be directly awarded to the winner of 2022 FIBA Women's Basketball World Cup, held in Sydney, Australia from 22 September to 1 October 2022.

These two directly qualified teams, however, are eligible to compete in two successive stages, namely the FIBA Olympic Pre-qualifying tournaments (for Africa, Americas, and Asia and Oceania) or FIBA Women's EuroBasket (for Europe) and the four-way global FIBA Olympic qualifying tournaments (FOQTs). While two FOQTs will attribute the Paris 2024 spots to their top three teams, the other half of the four FOQT pathways, featuring the host nation France and the World Cup winner, provides quota places to the two highest-ranked teams.

Method
Twelve teams will participate in the women's basketball tournament, with each NOC sending a roster of 12 players.

Host nation
As the host nation, France reserves a direct quota place in the women's basketball subject to the FIBA Central Board decision to be made on 30 June 2023. If the FIBA Central Board does not award a direct spot to the host country, the number of teams qualified through the regular process shall be increased accordingly.

Qualification process
The first spot will be directly awarded to the winner of 2022 FIBA Women's Basketball World Cup, held in Sydney, Australia from 22 September to 1 October 2022. Similar to the pre-Olympic format in Tokyo 2020, two directly qualified teams, the host nation France and the World Cup winner, are eligible to compete at the FIBA Women's Olympic pre-qualifying tournaments (for Africa, Americas, and Asia and Oceania) or FIBA Women's EuroBasket (for Europe) and the four-way global FIBA Women's Olympic qualifying tournaments (FWOQTs).

National teams from Africa, the Americas, and Asia (including Oceania) will play in the FIBA Women's Olympic pre-qualifying tournaments (FWOPQTs), with the top two in each tournament advancing to one of the four-way FOQTs. In Europe, the qualification route commences with the EuroBasket Women 2023 to be contested in three windows (November 2021, November 2022, and February 2023). The top six teams will directly qualify for the four-way FWOQTs at the end of the tournament.

The four-way global FIBA Women's Olympic qualifying tournament, scheduled for February 2024, will be contested by the following top sixteen teams across all continents based on the results from the FWOPQTs. The three highest-ranked teams (including the host nation and the World Cup winner) from each of the four tournaments will complete the women's basketball lineup for Paris 2024.

 AfroBasket Women – 2 teams advanced through FWOPQTs
 FIBA Women's AmeriCup – 4 teams advanced through FWOPQTs
 FIBA Women's Asia Cup – 4 teams advanced through FWOPQTs
 EuroBasket Women –  6 teams advanced through EuroBasket Women 2023, including host nation France

Qualified teams

FIBA Women's Olympic Qualifying Tournaments

References

 
Basketball at the 2024 Summer Olympics
Qualification for the 2024 Summer Olympics
2024